The governmental learning spiral© is a method to structure face-to-face or virtual innovation and learning events such as workshops, conferences, roundtables, trainings, e-learning, etc. to solve complex political problem situations and governance challenges. The governmental learning spiral is based on a heuristic and multidisciplinary approach that was theoretically and conceptually developed over the last two decades and successfully applied worldwide in numerous local, national as well as international events to improve performance in democratic governance. The method has been described for the first time by Raoul Blindenbacher and Ronald Lampman Watts in the book "Federalism in a Changing World", a publication edited by Raoul Blindenbacher and former Swiss President Arnold Koller in 2003. The governmental learning spiral was further developed in the World Bank publication "The Black Box of Governmental Learning" in 2010.

Concept
The governmental learning spiral consists of a three-phase template that structures the didactics of the political innovation and learning event. Each phase is undercut by ten stages in all. The process comprises ex-ante activities such as the conceptualisation and planning of the event, its execution, where concrete problem solutions are developed, as well as ex-post activities, where these solutions are implemented, evaluated and a new process is relaunched, if considered needed by those involved. 

A major characteristic of this type of governmental innovation and learning event is itsfacilitation by a learning broker who oversees all aspects of the event organisation. These include logistics, content preparation, drafting and implementation of the agenda, moderation of the learning sessions, and follow-up activities. The learning broker designs the learning process according to the specific governance challenge at hand.

The event must be structured based on several factors:
 The specific challenge a government is facing.
 An analysis of the kind of knowledge a government needs to address. 
 The particular political and institutional environment, which determines who will participate in the activity.

The participants invited to the event must represent different substantive and organizational perspectives and play a precisely defined role as both knowledge holders and knowledge seekers. When this is achieved, participants have unlimited access to the collective wealth of the shared tacit and explicit knowledge.

The effects of applying the governmental learning spiral technique are threefold: The primary effect is that governments gain access to the latest knowledge in democratic governance, which they can then apply to specific governance challenges with concrete, practical action. A second effect is that—because of the iterative character of the innovation and learning process—the knowledge being learned is always validated and updated in real time to include the latest experiences on the subject. A third effect is that participation in the learning process evokes a sense of social belonging among the learning actors, which often leads to the creation of networks and communities of practice where governments continue to share their latest experiences and by doing so launch the next spin of the governmental learning spiral.

Template
The governmental learning spiral template with its three phases and ten-stages structures an innovation and learning event in the following distinctive procedure:

1. Before the event (framing phase): The conceptualization, triangulation, and accommodation stages are the preparatory stages, where the specific governance challenge is defined, existing knowledge on the topic is framed, participants are selected and invited, and trust is established between the learning actors and the event learning broker and between participants and the learning process itself.

2. During the event (reflection phase): The internalization, externalization, re-conceptualization, and transformation stages represent the core of the process, where learning actors develop and review new knowledge according to their personal experiences. Thereafter the actors readjust their individual and organisational thinking and behavior accordingly in an elaborate inter- and intra-personal reflection procedure.

3. After the event (projection phase): The follow-up to the learning event occurs in the configuration, action, and iteration stages, where the new knowledge is documented and disseminated to everyone involved in the event as well as to a wider audience, who wants to implement that knowledge in its respective field of practice. Depending the evaluation results of these activities a next spin of the governmental learning spiral may be launched in the context of a new learning system.

Because knowledge in governance has a short half-life and has to be updated constantly, the learning process itself must also be ongoing. This procedure, where knowledge is constantly reviewed, renewed, and transformed into political action in a real-time, multi-turn process, can be illustrated as a spiral. Each of the ten stages of the learning process are bound together by a "spin," which ends with the last iteration stage and restarts the next spin with its first configuration stage.

Application examples
 Second International Conference on Federalism
 A global dialogue on federalism
 Seminar on the Iraqi judiciary system and the second chamber of parliament
 Workshop about lessons of a decade of Public Sector Reform: Voices of African Client Stakeholders
 Global multimedia training and e-learning initiative in the area of private-public partnership in infrastructure
 Making a difference in minearal-rich areas of the Deomocratic Republic of the Congo
 
 OECD Development Pathways, Multi-dimensional Review of Thailand. Volume 3: From Analysis to Action

See also

 Community of practice
Government performance management
Knowledge transfer
New public management
 Organizational learning
 Public administration
Policy transfer
Policy learning
Transformative learning

References

Sources

Doornbos, Martin. 2003. Good Governance: The Metamorphosis of a Policy Metaphor. Journal of International Affairs 57 (1): 3–17.
Dolowitz, David, and Marsh, David. 2000. Learning from Abroad: The Role of Policy Transfer in Contemporary Policy Making. Governance: An International Journal of Policy and Administration 13 (1): 9.
Finer, S.E. 1997. History of Government from the Earliest Times. London: Oxford University Press.
March, James G., and Johan P. Olsen. 1995. Democratic Governance. New York: The Free Press.
Rose, Richard. 1991. “What Is Lesson Drawing?” Journal of Public Policy 11 (1): 3–30.

Further reading

External links

Government